Pavlo Krutous (born 9 April 1992) is a Ukrainian basketball player for BC Budivelnyk of the European North Basketball League and the Champions League and also the Ukrainian national team, where he participated at the EuroBasket 2015.

References

1992 births
Living people
BC Budivelnyk players
BC Kalev/Cramo players
BC Kyiv players
Expatriate basketball people in Estonia
Korvpalli Meistriliiga players
Kyiv-Basket players
People from Bila Tserkva
Small forwards
Sportspeople from Kyiv Oblast
Ukrainian men's basketball players